Queen for a Day is an American radio and television game show that helped to usher in American listeners' and viewers' fascination with big-prize giveaway shows. Queen for a Day originated on the Mutual Radio Network on April 30, 1945, in New York City before moving to Los Angeles a few months later and ran until 1957. The show then ran on NBC Television from 1956 to 1960 and on ABC Television from 1960 to 1964.

The show became popular enough that NBC increased its running time from 30 to 45 minutes to sell more commercials, at a then-premium rate of $4,000 per minute.

Format 
The show opened with host Jack Bailey asking the audience—mostly women—"Would YOU like to be Queen for a day?" After this, the contestants were introduced and interviewed, one at a time, with commercials and fashion commentary interspersed in between. 

Each contestant was asked to talk about the recent financial and emotional hard times she had been through. The interview would climax with Bailey asking the contestant what she needed most and why she wanted to win the title of Queen for a Day. Often the request was for medical care or therapeutic equipment to help a chronically ill child, or might be for a hearing aid, a new washing machine, or a refrigerator. Many women broke down sobbing as they described their plights.

The winning contestant was selected by the audience using an applause meter; the harsher the contestant's situation, the likelier the studio audience was to ring the applause meter's highest level. The winner, to the musical accompaniment of "Pomp and Circumstance", would be draped in a sable-trimmed red velvet robe, given a glittering jeweled crown to wear, placed on a velvet-upholstered throne, and handed a dozen long-stemmed roses to hold while her list of prizes was announced.

The prizes began with the help the woman had requested, and included a variety of extras, many of which were donated by sponsoring companies, such as a vacation trip, a night on the town with her husband, silver-plated flatware, an array of kitchen appliances, or a selection of fashion clothing. The losing contestants were each given smaller prizes.

Bailey's trademark sign-off was: "This is Jack Bailey, wishing we could make every woman a queen, for every single day!"

Cast 
 Jack Bailey as Himself
 Jeanne Cagney as Herself
 Gene Baker as Announcer
 Fort Pearson as Announcer
 John Harlan as Announcer
 Maxine Reeves as Head Model (1945-1964)
 Carol Silversparre as Model (1945-1964)
 Jann Darlyn as Model
 Suzanne Alexander as Model (1953-1964)
 Jolene Brand as Model
 Pat Sheehan as Model (1952-1953)
 Dorene Georgeson as Model
 Beverly Adams as Model
 Beverly Christensen as Model
 Doris Gildart as Model
 Naida Curtis as Model (1953-1954)
 Barbara Luke as Model
 Suzanne Ames as Model
 Beverly Lyon as Model
 Millicent Deming as Model
 Patricia Nanton as Model (1953)
 Virginia Bingman as Model
 Darlene Stuart (née Coats) as Model 
 Jackie Kenley as Model
 Mary Ellen Gleason as Model
 Josephine Burris as Model (1953)
 Dolores Fuller as Model
 Marilyn Burtis as Model (1953-1964)
 Jewell Glasser as Model
 Mary Lou Morgan as Model
 Lois Schaumburg (née Kiecker) as Model
 Gloria Moore (née Crawford) as Model (1952-1954)
 Eunice Hadley as Model
 Rosenell "Revell" Krech (née Farrell) as Model
 Nicole De Meyer as Model
 Katherine "Kathy" Taylor (née Cook) as Head Model
 Marilyn Hare as Model
 Mary Tobin as Model (1955)
 Cathie Righter as Model
 Jean Spangler as Model
 Wendy Waldron as Model
 Marie Gray as Model
 Lisa Davis as Model
 Lesley Alexander as Model
 Jo Anne Saravolatz as Model
 Lois Rayman as Model
 Diane Mills as Model (1964)
 Marilyn Crooker as Model
 Barbara Lyon (née Miller) as Model
 Sharon Overman (née Moss) as Model
 Paulette Lollar as Model
 Crystal Reeves as Head Model
 June Lyden as Model
 June Blanchard as Model (1949-1950)
 Lee Whitney as Model (1953)
 Anna-Lisa as Model
 Linda Waddle as Model (1960)
 Barbara Stagge as Model (1960)
 Sally Sublette as Model (1960)
 Joan Foellger as Model (1960)
 Mary Beth Hempfling as Model (1960)
 Dee Sandvig as Model (1963)
 June Kirby as Model

Past winners 
 Margaret Pond
 Erma Baker
 Viola Layne
 Eva Jean Wilcox

 Shirley Dykema
 Mary Bartley
 June Stauffer
 Lesley Spurgeon
 Virginia Hunt Newman
 Sue Witt
 Doris Brockelbank
 Wilhelmina Van Son
 Margaret Smith
 Gurtrude Pagne
 Margaret Duval
 Mary Wilks
 John Martin
 Edith Manvell
 Harvey Spittell
 Josephine Keefe
 Gloria Mackson
 Mary Lou Wentworth
 Marilyn Dawson
 Fannie Baskett

Reception
The show was not without its critics for exploiting people's hardships for profit. Veteran television writer Mark Evanier has called the program "one of the most ghastly shows ever produced." He further described it as "tasteless, demeaning to women, demeaning to anyone who watched it, cheap, insulting and utterly degrading to the human spirit."

Broadcast history

Radio 
Ken Murray hosted the original radio version of the show on the Mutual–Don Lee Radio Network. When the series began, in New York City on April 30, 1945, it was titled Queen for Today. A few months later, the show moved to Hollywood and acquired the more familiar title Queen for a Day with Jack Bailey, a former vaudeville musician and World's Fair barker, as host. The show aired five days a week during the daytime.

Film 
In 1951, a fictional comedy-drama film adaptation of the show was released by United Artists. Titled Queen for a Day, it purported to be a behind-the-scenes look at the show while at the same time spoofing the show's basic premise. The movie starred Bailey as the host and featured Darren McGavin, Phyllis Avery, and Leonard Nimoy, among others.

Television 
Bailey stayed on as host as Queen for a Day jumped from radio to television. With the addition of a visual component, the fashion aspect of the show expanded and each episode featured three to five young women modelling the upscale apparel that would be given away to contestants. Other visual stunts, such as a circus-themed episode featuring ponies and clowns from Ringling Brothers Barnum and Bailey Circus, helped bring the show into the television era. Through all of these changes, however, Bailey remained the interviewer who, over and over again, brought the contestants—and the live female audience—to tears. The first televised episode, a rebroadcast of an earlier radio episode, featured Pearl Stevens of Claremont, California. Models on the series included Maxine Reeves, Carol Silversparre, Jann Darlyn, Suzanne Alexander, Pat Sheehan, Patricia Nanton, and Jolene Brand.

Live remote broadcasts and unscripted interviews added to the show's believability. One of the show's telecast locations was the Earl Carroll Theatre on Sunset Blvd. in Hollywood, renamed the Moulin Rouge in 1953. During each episode, the cameras panned over the audience as the women waved and cheered.

From 1948 through 1955, the show was simulcast on radio. It began airing on television on January 7, 1952. Both versions aired locally in the Los Angeles market on the Don Lee network. 

NBC picked up the show for national broadcast from January 3, 1956 to September 2, 1960, and aired it live across the nation (1:30 PST in Los Angeles and 4:30 EST in New York). It proved to be very popular  and Bailey and the program were featured on the cover of TV Guide for the week of June 22–28, 1957.

ABC broadcast the series nationally from September 5, 1960, until the end of the run on October 2, 1964.

Revivals 
On September 8, 1969, after a five-year hiatus, a new version of the show debuted in syndication with Dick Curtis as host. The premise remained largely the same; however, this version only ran until September 18, 1970. Viewers turned away from the format when it was revealed that, unlike the radio and earlier television versions, the new show was rigged and the "winners" were apparently paid actresses chosen to "win" the prizes prior to the start of each taping. 

In 1987, Barry & Enright Productions in conjunction with Fries Distribution attempted to revive Queen for a Day with Monty Hall as host for the Fall of 1988 but with no success.

On May 27, 2004, (originally May 24, 2004) after being off the air for more than 34 years, it was revived as a one-time special airing on cable network Lifetime with actress and comedian Mo'Nique as host. Judges for this version were Joely Fisher, Meshach Taylor, and Dayna Devon. The only difference between this version and the original was that the winner was not determined by audience applause.

Documentary 
A documentary about the series titled The History of Queen for a Day was produced by Ray Morgan Jr. It was never officially released, but it is available on YouTube. It features interviews from models Maxine Reeves, Barbara Luke, and Beverly Christensen, as well as producers Ed Kranyak and Chuck Forman.

Musical 
In 2012, a musical was made based on the show called Queen for a Day: The Musical, starring Alan Thicke as Jack Bailey The outspoken and strong-willed Claribel Anderson (played by Blythe Wilson) finds herself along with fellow waitress Lana Beutler (played by Marisa McIntyre) at the glamorous Moulin Rouge Theatre, where the hit show tapes daily. Here the girls meet the quirky and charismatic host Jack Bailey and a colorful cast of Hollywood players who are ready and willing to build the Queen for a Day dream. Bailey sees the women, listens to many stories, dries many tears—but only one can be queen. Eventually Claribel lands as a contestant on the show. Her 15 minutes of fame send her down a road of self-discovery, forcing her to question her dream of being the perfect 50's housewife.

International versions

Australia 
An Australian version aired in Melbourne on station HSV-7 from 1960 to 1962.

Brazil 
The Brazilian version was hosted by Silvio Santos and aired on The Globo in 1972 under the title Boa Noite, Cinderella (Good Night/Evening, Cinderella). This version awarded gifts for children (mainly little girls) instead of housewives. Years later, when the channel changed from TVS to SBT, it aired the program in the afternoons, dropping "Good Night" in its title and renaming it Cinderella, until it was cancelled in 1987.

Spanish-speaking countries 
In Mexico, an Aztec TV version, also called Reina por un día (Queen for One Day) was produced. First aired in 2011, it was originally hosted by Ingrid Coranado and then by Raquel Bigorra.

In the winter of 2011, a Spanish-language revival was hosted by Tomás Ramos (better known as The Red Shadow animator), aired on Univision in Puerto Rico under the name Reina por un día. The panel consisted of Amos Morals and Moraima Oyola.

In Spain, the show was also called Reina por un día (Queen for One Day), hosted by José Luis Barcelona and Mario Cabré. It was aired on Televisión Española from 1964 until 1966, mostly on Sunday afternoons.

Ownership rights 
In 2008, RDF USA obtained the rights to the show with plans to pitch an update version to broadcast and cable networks.

Seven episodes are currently licensed by the Peter Rogers Organization.

Similar shows 
Queen for a Day shared much in common with two other shows of its era, Strike It Rich (on radio and television from 1947 to 1958) and It Could Be You (on television from 1956 to 1961).

A third similar show was On Your Way (on the DuMont Television Network and ABC from 1953 to 1954), which also used contestants with unfortunate stories, giving them transportation tickets as a reward for correct answers to quiz questions.

The major difference between Queen for a Day and these other "sympathy shows" was that they asked their poverty-stricken contestants to win prizes within a conventional quiz show format, with the winner essentially earning the prizes through his or her cleverness. Queen for a Day, on the other hand, dispensed with the quiz-show format entirely: All the contestants were women, and the only way a woman could win was by sincerely touching the heart-strings of the live female audience, who would then award her the greatest volume on the "applause meter." Prizes were sponsored by industry leaders in appliances, home goods and apparel; such as the famed Spiegel Catalog, who offered each guest a credit allowance to spend from their catalog of more than 30,000 items.

Episode status 
Recordings of the series are believed to have been destroyed, as per network practices of the era.

Twelve episodes are held at the UCLA Film and Television Archive, including two from the Don Lee network era: the August 21, 1953, radio episode simulcast on television in Los Angeles and the July 4, 1955, show with Adolphe Menjou guest-hosting to crown a king instead of a queen (as was done about once or twice a year). The latest episode held at the archive is from July 13, 1964, near the end of the show's run on ABC.

Two kinescoped episodes from 1956 exist in the J. Fred & Leslie W. MacDonald Collection of the Library of Congress. These include a 45-minute installment from February 2, 1956, and a half-hour installment from October 25, 1956.

Fourteen episodes are held at The Paley Center in Beverly Hills, California.

Old Time Radio Catalog has four episodes -in audio format only- archived, dated August 10, 1945, February 14, 1948, February 13, 1950, and May 23, 1952.

In 2005, First Look Media released a three-disc DVD set of seven episodes transferred from their original kinescope elements plus rare footage of an additional five episodes; the total runtime is 210 minutes.

See also 
 Strike It Rich (1950s TV series)
 On Your Way
 United States in the 1950s

References 
Notes

External links 
 Official Website
 
  (1958 episode)
  (1960 episode)
  (1963 episode)
 Article about "Queen for a Day" Lifetime Special (2004)

1945 radio programme debuts
1957 radio programme endings
1956 American television series debuts
1969 American television series debuts
1964 American television series endings
1970 American television series endings
1940s American radio programs
1950s American radio programs
1940s American game shows
1950s American game shows
1960s American game shows
American radio game shows
American Broadcasting Company original programming
Black-and-white American television shows
English-language television shows
First-run syndicated television programs in the United States
Mutual Broadcasting System programs
NBC original programming
Don Lee Network programs